Michael James Hart (8 May 1970 – 23 August 2020) was an Australian musician. His debut album, Still the Flowers Bloom (March 2001), reached the ARIA Albums Chart top 100. It had been recorded in late 2000 with Jim Moginie (of Midnight Oil) producing. Hart's second album, Upside Down in the Full Face of Optimism, was nominated for Best Blues & Roots Album at the ARIA Music Awards of 2002.

On 25 August 2020, it was reported that Hart had died.

Discography

Albums

Extended plays

Singles

References

External links
Mick Hart Official website
 

2020 deaths
Australian male singers
People from Gunnedah
1970 births